The 2009 UNAF U-17 Tournament was an association football tournament that took place on 12-20 August 2009 in Ain Draham, Tunisia.

Group stage
All times are local UTC+1.

Group A

Group B

Knockout stage

Third-place match

Final

Champions

References

External links
 UNAF U-17 Tournament history - unaf official website

2009 in African football
2009
2008
2009–10 in Algerian football
2009–10 in Tunisian football
2009–10 in Libyan football
2009–10 in Moroccan football
2009–10 in Emirati football